EP2, EP-2 or EP 2 may refer to:

Music
 EP2 (FKA Twigs EP), 2013
 EP2 (The Kleptones EP), 2006
 EP2 (Pixies EP), 2014
 EP2 (Yaeji EP), 2017
 EP 2 (Basement Jaxx EP), 1995
 EP 2 (Crosses EP), 2012
 EP 2 (Odd Year & The Reverb Junkie EP), 2014
 EP 2 (Qveen Herby EP), 2017
 EP 2 (Zero 7 EP), 2000
 EP2! (JPEGMafia EP). 2021
 EP2 (Body Type EP), 2019

Other uses
 Milwaukee Road class EP-2, a locomotive
 Olympus PEN E-P2, a camera
 PKP class EP02, a Polish electric locomotive used by the Polish railway operator PKP
 Prostaglandin E2 receptor
 EP2, a chemical process used to develop color photographs in the 1980s and 1990s
 EP2 procyclin, a trypanosome procyclin protein

See also
 Episode II (disambiguation)